The 2018 McDonald's All-American Boys Game was an All-star basketball game that was played on Wednesday, March 28, 2018 at the Philips Arena in Atlanta, Georgia, home of the Atlanta Hawks. The game's rosters featured the best and most highly recruited high school boys graduating in 2018. The game is the 41st annual version of the McDonald's All-American Game first played in 1977.

The 24 players were selected from 2,500 nominees by a committee of basketball experts. They were chosen not only for their on-court skills but for their performances off the court as well. Coach Morgan Wootten, who had more than 1,200 wins as head basketball coach at DeMatha Catholic High School, was chairman of the selection committee.

Rosters
When the rosters were announced on January 16, 2018, Duke & Kansas both had three selectees, while Oregon, Kentucky, North Carolina, and Vanderbilt each had two. At the announcement of roster selections, only 10 schools were represented and had 6 players uncommitted. On Jan. 20, Zion Williamson committed to Duke, giving them four selections which gave them most of any school. On Jan. 22, Moses Brown committed to UCLA which brought the total number of schools to 11. John Mirabello (Northwest Catholic High School, West Hartford, Conn.) and Brad Lauwers (A.J. Dimond High School, Anchorage, Alaska) coached the East and West teams, respectively.

Team East

Team West

† On March 29, Darius Bazley withdrew from his commitment to Syracuse in order to compete in the NBA G League (via entering his name in the 2018 NBA G League Draft) to prepare for the 2019 NBA draft.

^undecided at the time of roster selection
~undecided at game time
Reference

Box Score

References

McDonald's All-American Boys Game
Basketball in Atlanta
McDonald's All-American
McDonald's All-American